Giralda Farms was the estate of Geraldine Rockefeller Dodge in Madison, New Jersey. She would hold dog shows at the property.  After her death it was converted into a corporate park containing the headquarters for Quest Diagnostics, and other corporations.

References

Madison, New Jersey
Buildings and structures in Morris County, New Jersey
Farms in New Jersey